A myograph is any device used to measure the force produced by a muscle when under contraction. Such a device is commonly used in myography, the study of the velocity and intensity of muscular contraction. 

A myograph can take several forms: for tubular structures such as blood vessels these include the pressure myograph (where a segment of a blood vessel is cannulated at either or both ends) and the wire myograph (where the blood vessel segment is threaded onto a pair of pins or wires); for skeletal muscle other devices such as the acceleromyograph can be used.

In pharmacology, myographs are used to record muscle contraction in organ bath preparations.

The related technique of electromyography is used to measure electrical activity of the muscle instead of force.

References

External links
 Information on microvessel studies (wire myograph)
 Various types of blood vessel myographs
 Blood vessel myographs

Exercise physiology